Kristin Green is the director of the Australian architecture practice Kristin Green Associates architecture (KGA architecture) based in Melbourne, Australia.

Early life and education
Green was born in Melbourne, and studied architecture at RMIT University, graduating in 2004.  Her thesis was published in the 2001 RMIT Architecture Design Thesis Major Projects catalogue of student work, The Bold and the Beautiful.

Career
Having worked for a variety of Melbourne architectural practices, such as Hassell, BKK Architects, Peter Mills, Boschler and Taylor Cullity Lethlean (TCL), in 2009 Green established KGA Architecture.  At TCL, Green was part of the project team on the multi-award winning Craigieburn Bypass project.

In 2014, her project La Plage du Pacifique was included in the Sustainable Empires exhibition at the Palace Albrizzi as part of the collateral events for the 2014 Venice Architecture Biennale, Fundamentals, directed by Rem Koolhaas. In 2015, she is an invited speaker at Risk, the Australian Institute of Architects National Conference.
 
Green teaches design regularly at RMIT and Melbourne Universities.  She is active in Australian architecture culture as a member of the Australian Institute of Architects and sat on the Interior Architecture Awards Jury in 2014.

Her project, La Plage du Pacifique, features on the cover of RMIT's Innovation Professor of Architecture Leon Van Schaik’s 2015 book Practical Poetics in Architecture.

Notable works
La Plage du Pacifique, Vanuatu.

Spring Street Grocer, Melbourne Australia.

Awards

 2013: KGA was awarded Best Retail Design at the 2013 Eat-Drink Design Awards for the Spring Street Grocer in Melbourne.
 2015: Joint award winner of the Inaugural Tapestry Design Prize for Architects with John Wardle Architects and Michelle Hamer.

References

External links
http://www.kgaarchitecture.com.au/
http://architectureau.com/articles/2013-eat-drink-design-awards-best-retail-design/
http://architectureau.com/articles/spring-street-grocer/
http://architectureau.com/articles/la-plage-du-pacifique/
http://www.designboom.com/architecture/kristin-greens-beautiful-fortress-on-the-coast-la-plage-dhotel-du-pacifique-1-20-2014/
https://web.archive.org/web/20150314033127/http://www.kristingreenarchitecture.com/projects.html
http://www.dezeen.com/2013/10/22/la-plage-du-pacifique-hotel-kristin-green-peter-bennetts/
http://architectureau.com/articles/la-plage-du-pacifique-1/

Australian women architects
Living people
RMIT University alumni
Architects from Melbourne
21st-century Australian architects
20th-century Australian architects
Year of birth missing (living people)
20th-century Australian women